Geurt Gijssen (born 15 August 1934) is a Dutch chess International Arbiter (1979), FIDE Honorary Member (2013).

Biography
Geurt Gijssen was born in Germany, where his father worked for tobacco company, but after World War II the family returned to the Netherlands. He has lived in Nijmegen since 1952, where he worked as a mathematics teacher at a secondary school until retired in 1983.

Geurt Gijssen was well known as a chess tournament referee. He has been the head referee of several Chess Olympiads (1998, 2000, 2002, 2006), as well as several matches and tournaments for World Chess Champion titles:
 Garry Kasparov – Anatoly Karpov (1987, 1990),
 Anatoly Karpov – Gata Kamsky (1996),
 Anatoly Karpov – Vishwanathan Anand (1998),
 FIDE World Chess Championship (1999),
 Vladimir Kramnik – Veselin Topalov (2006).

In 2013, he became a FIDE Honorary Member and in 2019 he received the Golden Pawn for best European Chess Arbiter from the European Chess Union

References

External links
Geurt Gijssen chess games at 365Chess.com

1934 births
Living people
Dutch chess players
Chess arbiters